The John Pennington–Henry Ford House, also known as the John Banks House, is a private residence located at 8281 Clinton Macon Road in Macon Township in the northeast corner of Lenawee County, Michigan.  It was designated as a Michigan Historic Site on September 17, 1974, and later added to the National Register of Historic Places on December 31, 1974.

History
In 1829, John and Hannah Pennington moved from Perinton, New York to this location in Michigan. At the time, the Penningtons were the only settlers between Tecumseh and Saline. They built a shanty and began clearing the land. That fall they built a log cabin. More settlers soon arrived, and a small settlement sprang up.

Some time around 1845, the Penningtons built this house. They continued to live here until John's death in 1883 and Hannah's soon after. At that time,  John M. Pennington, the couple's son, moved into the house. John M. Pennington died in 1929, and the house has soon purchased by automotive magnate Henry Ford, who purchased and restored the property in the 1930s.  He used the surrounding farmland to conduct experiments on soybeans.  Ford later sold the property, and it remains privately owned. The home is currently for sale for 650,000 dollars.

Description
The house is a symmetric two-story Greek Revival farmhouse with a recessed, pillared porch on the ground level. Single-story wings extend to each side of the main section. The house is sided with narrow boards, and sits on a fieldstone foundation.

The interior of the house contains a pantry and three bedrooms on the ground floor, and one large bedroom on the second floor. Bathrooms were added at a later date. The interior has oak floors and black walnut woodwork.

References

Houses in Lenawee County, Michigan
Greek Revival houses in Michigan
Houses on the National Register of Historic Places in Michigan
Michigan State Historic Sites
Farms on the National Register of Historic Places in Michigan
National Register of Historic Places in Lenawee County, Michigan